Adham Sheikh Othman Sheikh Ahmad  Barzani (born April 16, 1962) is a former member of Iraqi Kurdistan National Assembly.  He is former Kurdish President Massoud Barzani's cousin.

The Kurdish Revolutionary Hezbollah (KRH) was led by Adham Barzani which was established in 1988 as a splinter group from Kurdish Hezbollah of Iran. Like other Iraqi Kurdish parties, the group received funds from Iran in the 1990s.  KRH was dissolved in 2004. Adham Barzani became a member of Kurdistan Parliament on Kurdistan Democratic Party's list.

References

1962 births
Living people
Kurdistan Democratic Party politicians

 He was a high member of the Kurdistan Democratic Party, he had a special position within the PDK